Bob Burt (born 1941) is a former American football coach. He served as the head football coach at United States International University (USIU) in 1975 and California State University, Northridge from 1986 to 1994, compiling a career college football coaching record of 56–49. Burt also coached at a number of high schools in California between 1962 and 2016.

Early life, playing career, and education
Burt attended San Pedro High School in the San Pedro neighborhood of Los Angeles, where he played football and baseball before graduating in 1958. He played college football at Adams State College—now known as Adams State University—Alamosa, Colorado as a center and defensive end. Burt graduated from Los Angeles State College—now known as California State University, Los Angeles–in 1962.

Coaching career
Burt began his coaching career in 1962 as an assistant at St. Paul High School in Santa Fe Springs, California under head coach Marijon Ancich. In 1966, he was appointed to his first head coaching job, at Pater Noster High School in Los Angeles. After three years as head coach at Pater Noster, Burt moved on to Santiago High School in Garden Grove, California, where he served as head football coach for six years.

In 1975, Burt was hired as the head football coach at United States International University (USIU) in San Diego, but resigned after one season, in January 1976, citing a his long commute. He was living in Garden Grove and teaching at La Quinta High School in Westminster, California while coaching part-time at USIU.

Burt worked as the defensive line coach at University of California, Los Angeles (UCLA) in 1976. Following that season, UCLA's defensive coordinator, Dick Tomey, was hired the head football coach at the University of Hawaiʻi at Mānoa and took Burt with him as his defensive coordinator. After three years at Hawaii, Burt moved on to California State University, Fullerton, where he served as defensive coordinator for six seasons under head coach Gene Murphy.

Head coaching record

College

References

1941 births
Living people
American football centers
American football defensive ends
Adams State Grizzlies football players
Cal State Fullerton Titans football coaches
Cal State Northridge Matadors football coaches
Hawaii Rainbow Warriors football coaches
UCLA Bruins football coaches
United States International Gulls football coaches
High school football coaches in Arizona
High school football coaches in California
California State University, Los Angeles alumni
People from San Pedro, Los Angeles
Sports coaches from Los Angeles
Coaches of American football from California
Players of American football from Los Angeles
Schoolteachers from California